Abu Ishaq al-Heweny (born 10 June 1956). was born in the village of Hewen in Kafr el-Sheikh Governorate in Egypt.  In 2015, the Egyptian Ministry of Religious Endowments initiated a campaign to remove any books authored by scholars like Al Heweny from all mosques in Egypt.

References

 

1956 births
Living people
Egyptian Salafis
People from Kafr El Sheikh Governorate
Egyptian Sunni Muslim scholars of Islam
Ain Shams University alumni